Brownfield Independent School District is a public school district based in Brownfield, Texas (USA).

Brownfield ISD was rated "Academically acceptable" by the Texas State Board of Education in 2011, while the high school was once again rated "Academically Unacceptable".

Schools
Brownfield High School (Grades 9-12)
Brownfield Middle School (Grades 6-8)
Oak Grove Elementary (Grades 2-5)
Colonial Heights Elementary (Grades PK-1)

References

External links
Brownfield ISD

School districts in Terry County, Texas
School districts in Yoakum County, Texas